Brickfields Recreation Ground is a sports stadium and multi-sport complex in Devonport, Plymouth, England. It is run by EveryoneActive on behalf of Plymouth City Council, and is the home ground of Rugby Union team Plymouth Albion of the National League 1, who moved there in 2003, after leaving their old ground at Beacon Park. The highest crowd was 6,871, for a match against local rivals Exeter Chiefs in October 2008.

Following Albion's relegation to the National League 1 in 2015, the North stand of the rugby stadium which read "PARFC" in white seats, was demolished, and attendances dropped down to roughly 1,000 per match. although attendances have risen to almost 3,000 in occasional games.  Albion have two marquee tents next to the East and South stands that they hire out as a venue for receptions.

Since 1915, the site has been a recreation ground. Now it is run by Everyone Active and is home to a gym complex, which is built into the back of the West stand. The rest of complex includes:
 An Artificial turf football/hockey pitch
 Three grass football pitches
 One grass rugby pitch
 Athletics facilities
 Pétanque facilities
 A generic sports hall
 An exercise studio

References

Rugby union stadiums in England
Sports venues in Plymouth, Devon
Sports venues completed in 1915
1915 establishments in England